The Vickers F.B.26 Vampire was a British single-seat pusher biplane fighter built by Vickers during the First World War.

Four were built by Vickers at Bexleyheath, one of these was subsequently modified to become the F.B.26A.

Design and development
Behind this was a water-cooled 200 hp (150 kW) Hispano-Suiza engine driving the propeller. The tailplane was mounted on four booms with a single fin and rudder. After modifications to the radiator layout and wing structure and re-armed with  three Lewis guns in an Eeman mounting capable of firing up at a 45° angle to engage enemy bombers from below, being numbered B1484, the FB.26 was passed to the Aeroplane and Armament Experimental Establishment at Martlesham Heath for evaluation. The prototype was destroyed on 25 August 1917 when Harold Barnwell, the Vickers test pilot failed to recover from a spin.

A second aircraft, B1486, was built and was operated first by No. 39 Squadron at Woodford  and then passed to No. 141 Squadron of the Royal Flying Corps in February 1918. Service evaluation was unfavorable: although performance was satisfactory, its handling qualities were poor. A third aircraft, B1485, powered by a 230 hp (170 kW) Bentley rotary engine and modified for ground-attack was built in 1918 but by the time it was built the Sopwith Salamander had already been ordered for production and development was abandoned. Three further aircraft had been ordered and allocated service numbers but it is not known whether any of these were built.

Operators

Royal Flying Corps
No. 39 Squadron RFC
No. 141 Squadron RFC

Specifications (F.B.26 Vampire I)

References

Notes

Bibliography

Andrews, C.F and Morgan, E.B. Vickers Aircraft since 1908. London:Putnam, Second edition 1988. .
Bruce, J.M. War Planes of the First World War: Volume Three Fighters. London:Macdonald, 1969. .
 Green, William and Swanborough, Gordon. The Complete Book of Fighters. New York: Smithmark, 1994. .
 Lamberton, W.M. Fighter Aircraft of the 1914–1918 War. Herts, UK:Harleyford Publications, 1960.
 Mason, F.K. The British Fighter Since 1912 London, Putnam, 1992 
Flight p764 12 June 1919

External links

Profile of the Vampire and Vampire II

1910s British fighter aircraft
Single-engined pusher aircraft
Vampire
Military aircraft of World War I
Aircraft first flown in 1917
Sesquiplanes
Biplanes